{{Infobox military unit
|unit_name= 12th Marine Regiment
| image= 12th Marines logo.jpg
| image_size = 150
|caption= 12th Marine Regiment Insignia
|dates= October 4, 1927 – present
|country= 
|allegiance=
|branch= 
|type= Artillery Regiment
|role= Provide fires in support of 3rd Marine Division
|size=
|command_structure= 3rd Marine Division
|current_commander=Colonel Jonathan Sims
|garrison= Camp Smedley Butler, Okinawa, Japan
|ceremonial_chief=
|colonel_of_the_regiment=
|nickname= Thunder and Steel
|patron=
|motto= Honor, Fidelity, Valor
|colors=
|march=
|mascot=
|battles= World War II
 Battle of Guadalcanal
 Battle of Bougainville
 Battle of Guam
 Battle of Iwo Jima
Vietnam War
Operation Desert Storm
War on Terror
 Operation Enduring Freedom|notable_commanders=Donald M. WellerClifford B. Drake
|anniversaries=
}}

The 12th Marine Regiment''' is an artillery regiment of the United States Marine Corps based at Camp Smedley Butler, Okinawa, Japan.  Nicknamed "Thunder and Steel," the regiment falls under the command of the 3rd Marine Division.

Mission 
Provide close and continuous fire support by neutralizing, destroying, or suppressing targets which threaten the success of the supported unit.

Current Units 
The regiment is made up of two artillery battalions and one headquarters battery:
 Headquarters Battery, 12th Marines (HQ Battery, 12th Marines)
 1st Battalion, 12th Marines (1/12 Marines)
 3rd Battalion, 12th Marines (3/12 Marines)

History 
Activated October 4, 1927, at Tientsin, China and assigned to the 3rd Marine Brigade.

World War II 

The regiment was reactivated September 1, 1942, at San Diego, California, as the 12th Marines and assigned to the 3rd Marine Division.  It relocated during October 1942 to Camp Dunlap, California.  From there it deployed during March 1943 to Auckland, New Zealand.  In July 1943 it moved to Guadalcanal.

The regiment participated in the following World War II campaigns:
 Bougainville campaign (1944–45)
 Northern Solomons
 Battle of Guam
 Battle of Iwo Jima

Following the war, the 12th Marines relocated in December 1945 to Marine Corps Base Camp Pendleton, California.

Post World War II history 
Reactivated March 17, 1952, at Camp Pendleton, California, and assigned to the 3rd Marine Division.  Deployed during August 1953 to Camp McNair, Japan.  Redeployed during February 1956 to Okinawa. Redeployed from March–July 1965 to the Republic of Vietnam (South Vietnam).

Participated in the War in Vietnam, May 1965 – November 1969, operating from:

 Da Nang
 Phu Bai
 Chu Lai
 Huế
 Đông Hà

Redeployed from August–November 1969 to Camp Hansen, Okinawa.

Relocated during August 1971 to Camp Hauge, Okinawa. Elements participated in the Southeast Asia Evacuations, April–June 1975.  Elements participated in the recovery of the SS Mayaguez in May 1975.  Relocated during August 1976 to Camp Zukeran, Okinawa.  Camp Zukeran renamed Camp Foster during March 1980.

Elements participated in the Operation Desert Shield and Operation Desert Storm, Southwest Asia, September 1990-April 1991. Relocated during July 1998 to Camp Hansen, Okinawa.

Global War on Terror

Operation Enduring Freedom 
Operation Enduring Freedom is an ongoing war in Afghanistan entering its twelfth year. Marines from the battalion took part in the Helmand Province Campaign, particularly the Battle of Sangin.

See also 

 History of the United States Marine Corps
 List of United States Marine Corps regiments

Notes

External links 

 12th Marines' official website

012
Artillery